Mendo Ristovski (born 18 February 1956) is an Australian former association football player.

Playing career

Club career
Ristovski played for Footscray JUST in the National Soccer League.

International career
He played two matches for Australia.

References

Australian soccer players
Australia international soccer players
Australian people of Macedonian descent
1956 births
Living people
Association football forwards